Baha al-Din Sam III, was Sultan of the Ghurid dynasty from 1212 to 1213. He was the son and successor of Ghiyath al-Din Mahmud.

Biography 
Baha al-Din Sam III was the son of Ghiyath al-Din Mahmud, who was assassinated in 1212. After Ghiyath's assassination, Baha al-Din Sam III ascended the Ghurid throne. One year later, however, he was carried by the Khwarazmian-Shahs to Khwarezm. He was then succeeded by his relative Ala al-Din Atsiz.

References

Sources 

 

13th-century Iranian people
Ghurid dynasty
Year of death missing
Year of birth missing